The 1956–57 Turkish Federation Cup was the first professional nationwide football competition in Turkey. The tournament was organized by the Turkish Football Federation (TFF) to select a club that would represent Turkey in the 1957–58 European Cup. 30 clubs participated: 10 from Istanbul, 10 from İzmir, 8 from Ankara, and 2 from Adana. These teams were split into three groups: the Istanbul Group, İzmir Group, and the Ankara Group (the two clubs from Adana were included in the Ankara Group). The first three rounds were contested in a single knock-out system. The top two teams from each group qualified for the Final Group, which was played in league format. 

Beşiktaş won the title and qualified for the 1957–58 European Cup as Turkish champions. However, since the TFF failed to register their name for the draw in time, they could not participate in the European Cup in that season after all.

Round 1

Istanbul Group

İzmir Group

Ankara Group

Round 2

Istanbul Group

İzmir Group

 1 Göztepe won 2–0 in the playoff match.

Ankara Group

 2 Match abandoned at 3–0. Gençlerbirliği were awarded the win.

Round 3

Istanbul Group

İzmir Group

Ankara Group

Final group

References

External links
Turkish Soccer

Turkish Federation Cup
Cup
Turkey